Judith A. Bernstein is an American author. She is known for co-authoring the book, They Poured Fire on Us From the Sky: The True Story of Three Lost Boys of Sudan, 2005, with Sudanese brothers Alephonsion Deng and Benson Deng, and their cousin Benjamin Ajak. She co-authored a follow-up book titled, Disturbed in Their Nests, 2018 that continues the narrative from the first book with Alephonsion Deng.

Awards 
The two titles Bernstein has co-written have been the recipient of numerous awards.

They Poured Fire on Us From the Sky: The True Story of Three Lost Boys of Sudan:
 Christopher Award Winner for Adult Books
 The Washington Post Top 100 Books of 2005
 American Library Association "Many Voices" Honoree
 Los Angeles Times Bestseller July 2005. 
 American Booksellers Association Book Sense Selection May 2005. 
 National Conflict Resolution Center Peacemakers Award  
 Book Sense Summer 2006 Paperback Selection 
 American Library Association List - Becoming an American
 
 San Diego Union Tribune Warwick's Top Seller September 2015 (10th Anniversary Edition)

Disturbed in Their Nests
 2018 Nautilus Gold Award winner, in the category of Multicultural and Indigenous Books

References 

Year of birth missing (living people)
Living people
21st-century American women writers
University of California, San Diego alumni
21st-century American non-fiction writers
American women non-fiction writers
Writers from San Diego